Nikulinskaya is a rural locality (a village) in Dvinitskoye Rural Settlement, Syamzhensky District, Vologda Oblast, Russia. The population was 78 as of 2002.

Geography 
Nikulinskaya is located 52 km northeast of Syamzha (the district's administrative centre) by road. Vakhrushevskaya is the nearest rural locality.

References 

Rural localities in Syamzhensky District